The 1968 UC Santa Barbara Gauchos football team represented University of California, Santa Barbara (UCSB) during the 1968 NCAA College Division football season.

UCSB competed as an Independent in 1968. This was the last year for the Gauchos as the college level. They would move to the University Level in 1969 as a charter member of the Pacific Coast Athletic Association (PCAA). The team was led by sixth-year head coach "Cactus Jack" Curtice, and played home games at Campus Stadium in Santa Barbara, California. They finished the season with a record of four wins, four losses and one tie (4–4–1). For the 1968 season they outscored their opponents 253–163.

Schedule

Team players in the NFL
The following Santa Barbara Gaucho players were selected in the 1969 NFL Draft.

Notes

References

UC Santa Barbara
UC Santa Barbara Gauchos football seasons
UC Santa Barbara Gauchos football